Leaders for Global Operations (LGO) is a Dual Degree Engineering MBA program offered by Massachusetts Institute of Technology (MIT), sponsored by the MIT Sloan School of Management (MBA) and MIT School of Engineering (MS engineering).

History

Founding companies

Alcoa
Boeing
Digital Equipment Corporation (later Compaq)
Eastman Kodak
General Motors
Hewlett-Packard
Johnson & Johnson
Motorola
Polaroid
United Technologies Corporation

Academics
MIT Leaders for Global Operations program ranks 1st in the U.S. News & World Report for 2022's MBA programs in operations and production, 5th overall,  and 1st for best engineering school.

Engineering Departments
Aeronautics and Astronautics
Biological Engineering
Chemical Engineering
Civil and Environmental Engineering
Electrical Engineering and Computer Science
Mechanical Engineering
Nuclear Science and Engineering
Operations Research

Current Partner Companies
The program’s partner companies include:

ABB
Amazon
American Industrial Partners
Amgen
AstraZeneca
Bell Helicopters
Boeing
Boston Scientific
Caterpillar Inc.
Danaher Corporation
Dell
Flex (company)
General Motors
Goodyear Tire and Rubber Company
Inditex
Johnson & Johnson
LFM Capital
Li & Fung
Massachusetts General Hospital
MR Maschinenfabrik Reinhausen GmbH
National Grid plc
Nike, Inc.
Pacific Gas & Electric
Quest Diagnostics
Raytheon
Sanofi
Target Corporation
United Technologies Corporation
Verizon

People

Notable alumni
Jim Lawton - CEO, Rethink Robotics - LGO ’90
Patrick M. Shanahan - United States Deputy Secretary of Defense - LGO ‘91
Rick Dauch - President and CEO, Accuride Corporation - LGO ’92
Jeffrey A. Wilke - CEO of Worldwide Consumer at Amazon (company) - LGO ’93
Bill Anderson - CEO, Genentech - LGO ’95
Denise Johnson - Group President, Caterpillar Inc. - LGO ’97
Mick Ferrell - CEO, ResMed - LGO ’97
Guadalupe Hayes-Mota - CEO of Healr Solutions - LGO '16

References

External links
 

Massachusetts Institute of Technology
Science and technology in Massachusetts